Lee Simon Butler (born 30 May 1966) is an English retired footballer, who was most recently goalkeeping coach at Wrexham.

The highest level of football he played was at Aston Villa, although he found his first-team appearances limited there behind first choice goalkeeper Nigel Spink.

He joined Doncaster Rovers' coaching staff in 2008 under manager, Sean O'Driscoll, remaining until dismissed by Paul Dickov in the Summer of 2013  He then joined Bradford City in July 2013. In June 2016, he left Bradford to assume a similar role at Bolton Wanderers, leaving alongside manager Phil Parkinson. On 2 November 2019 Butler once again followed Parkinson, and became Sunderland's goalkeeping coach before departing with immediate effect on 12 July 2021 to take up a similar role at Wrexham AFC.

On June 24th 2022, Butler announced his retirement from coaching.

References

External links

1966 births
Living people
Footballers from Sheffield
English footballers
Association football goalkeepers
Lincoln City F.C. players
Boston United F.C. players
Aston Villa F.C. players
Hull City A.F.C. players
Barnsley F.C. players
Scunthorpe United F.C. players
Wigan Athletic F.C. players
Dunfermline Athletic F.C. players
Halifax Town A.F.C. players
Doncaster Rovers F.C. players
Alfreton Town F.C. players
Scottish Premier League players
Doncaster Rovers F.C. non-playing staff
Bradford City A.F.C. non-playing staff
Bolton Wanderers F.C. non-playing staff
Sunderland A.F.C. non-playing staff
Wrexham A.F.C. non-playing staff
Association football goalkeeping coaches